

Kinh ethnic group's games
Ô ăn quan
Tổ tôm
cờ lúa ngô
Cờ hùm tôm
Tứ sắc
Cờ tu hú
Đánh tam cúc
Thả diều
Đánh quay
Chơi chuyền
Mèo đuổi chuột
Rồng rắn lên mây
Cờ người
Pháo đất
Thổi cơm thi
Chọi gà
Đua thuyền
Thìa là thìa lẩy
Cá sáu lên bo
Nu na nu nống
Thả đỉa ba ba
Tập tầm vông
Ném cầu
Đánh roi múa mộc
Chơi đu
Kéo co
Đập niêu
Đấu vật
Bịt mắt bắt dê
Kéo cưa lừa xẻ
Vuốt hạt nổ
Cắp cua bỏ giỏ
Đánh búng
Đánh chắt
Chi chi chành chành
Rải ranh
Cướp cầu
Phụ đồng ếch
Ném vòng cổ vịt
Chọi trâu
Đánh phết
Lò cò
Đúc nậm đúc nị
Nhảy bao bố
Lộn cầu vồng
Nhảy ngựa
Nhảy dây
Bầu cua cá cọp
Đá cầu
Đi cà kheo
Trốn tìm
Xỉa cá mè
Dung dăng dung dẻ

Hmong ethnic group's games
Ném pao
Đánh cầu lông gà

Ede ethnic group's games
Trò chơi sắc màu
Trò chơi sỏi đá

Thai- Tay ethnic group's games
Tó Cối

Muong ethnic group's games
Đè Khà

Traditional games
Vietnamese games